Josephine Kane is a British academic and historian of architecture and the built environment.

Publications
The architecture of pleasure: British amusement parks 1900-1939 (2013). Ashgate Press.

References

Living people
Year of birth missing (living people)
British architectural historians
British women historians